Aizawl North 3 (Vidhan Sabha constituency) is one of the 40 assembly constituencies of  Mizoram a north east state of India.  Aizawl North 3 is also part of Mizoram Lok Sabha constituency. It is a reserved seat for the Scheduled tribes (ST).

Member of the Legislative Assembly

Election results

2018

2013

2008

See also 
 Aizawl

References

Assembly constituencies of Mizoram
Aizawl
Aizawl district